Fredrick Lewis (1886–1949) was an English footballer who played for Stoke.

Career
Owen was born in Stoke-upon-Trent and played for West Bromwich Albion before joining Stoke in 1909. He played in two matches during the 1909–10 season before entering amateur football with Cradley Heath St Luke's, Dudley Town and Brierley Hill Alliance.

Career statistics

References

1886 births
1949 deaths
Footballers from Birmingham, West Midlands
English footballers
Association football defenders
West Bromwich Albion F.C. players
Stoke City F.C. players
Cradley Heath F.C. players
Dudley Town F.C. players
Brierley Hill Alliance F.C. players
English Football League players
Date of birth missing
Date of death missing